Llimoniella is a genus of fungi in the family Cordieritidaceae. The genus was circumscribed by lichenologists Josef Hafellner and Père Navarro-Rosinés in 1993.

The genus name of Llimonaea is in honour of Xavier Llimona (1943 - x), who was a Spanish (Catalonian) botanist (Lichenology and Mycologp) and Professor of Botany at the University of Barcelona.

The genus was circumscribed by Josef Hafellner and Pere Navarro-Rosinés in Herzogia vol.9 on page 770 in 1993.

Species

Llimoniella acarosporicola 
Llimoniella adnata 
Llimoniella bergeriana 
Llimoniella caloplacae 
Llimoniella catapyrenii 
Llimoniella cinnabarinae 
Llimoniella fuscatae 
Llimoniella fuscoatrae 
Llimoniella gregorellae 
Llimoniella heppiae 
Llimoniella muralicola 
Llimoniella parmotrematis 
Llimoniella pertusariae 
Llimoniella phaeophysciae 
Llimoniella placomaroneae 
Llimoniella placopsidis 
Llimoniella pyrenulae 
Llimoniella ramalinae 
Llimoniella scabridula 
Llimoniella stereocaulorum 
Llimoniella terricola

References

Leotiomycetes
Leotiomycetes genera
Taxa described in 1993
Taxa named by Josef Hafellner